is a railway station on the Nippō Main Line in Yukuhashi, Fukuoka, Japan, operated jointly by Kyushu Railway Company (JR Kyushu) and the third-sector railway operator Heisei Chikuho Railway.

Lines
Yukuhashi Station is served by the Nippō Main Line and the Tagawa Line.

Adjacent stations

History
The station opened on 15 August 1895.

Passenger statistics
In fiscal 2016, the station was used by an average of 6,381 passengers daily (boarding passengers only), and it ranked 30th among the busiest stations of JR Kyushu.

See also
 List of railway stations in Japan

References

External links

 JR Kyushu official website 
 Heisei Chikuhō Railway official website 

Railway stations in Fukuoka Prefecture
Railway stations in Japan opened in 1895